Esther Arditi (1937 – 20 February 2003), also known as "The Angel in White," was an Israeli IDF medic, and the only woman to be awarded the Israeli Medal of Distinguished Service.

Early life and education
Arditi was born in 1937 in Sofia, Bulgaria, but grew up in Italy during the Second World War. After graduating from high school, she immigrated to Israel and enlisted in the Israeli Air Force.

Career
A week after earning her medic certification in 1954, Arditi saved combat pilot Yaakov Salomon and navigator Shlomo Hertzman from a burning Mosquito FB6 which had been struck by lightning while landing in a storm.  She began to steer an ambulance to the scene but it became stuck in mud caused by the storm. Arditi abandoned the ambulance and ran on foot towards the burning plane where she pulled out the injured crew just before it exploded. As a result of her heroism, she became the first and only female soldier to be awarded the Israeli Medal of Distinguished Service.

She continued her military involvement during the Six-Day War and Yom Kippur War, where she volunteered as a medic in a field hospital. Her achievements in the military earned her the nickname "Angel in White," which stayed with her until she died of cardiac arrest on 20 February 2003.

References

1937 births
Paramedics
Israeli soldiers
Italian emigrants to Israel
Recipients of the Medal of Distinguished Service
2003 deaths
Bulgarian emigrants to Italy
Bulgarian Jews in Israel
Israeli people of Bulgarian-Jewish descent
Women in 20th-century warfare
Israeli female military personnel